Plexin-A1 is a protein that in humans is encoded by the PLXNA1 gene.

Interactions
Plexin A1 has been shown to interact with AKT1.

References

Further reading